Rameez Junaid and Frank Moser were the defending champions, but decided not to participate.

Travis Rettenmaier and Simon Stadler won in the final 6–0, 6–2, against Flavio Cipolla and Thomas Fabbiano.

Seeds

Draw

Draw

References
 Main draw

Doubles